Abundantius is the name of several Christian saints:

Abundantius of Putignano, died as a martyr. His relics are venerated at Putignano. His feast day is celebrated on March 22.

Abundantius of Fiesole, was a deacon and martyr - see Abundius and Abundantius.

Abundantius of Ossuna, became a martyr with Leo and Donatus.

See also
Saint Abundantia (died 804), Christian saint
Abundius (disambiguation), the name of several Christian saints

References
 Holweck, F. G. A Biographical Dictionary of the Saints. St. Louis, MO: B. Herder Book Co. 1924.

Year of birth missing
Year of death missing
Christian saints in unknown century